Johannes Jacobus Posthumus (24 September 1887 in Gouda – 12 December 1978 in Utrecht) was a Dutch gymnast who competed in the 1908 Summer Olympics. He was part of the Dutch gymnastics team, which finished seventh in the team event. In the individual all-around competition he finished 66th.

References

External links
 

1887 births
1978 deaths
Dutch male artistic gymnasts
Gymnasts at the 1908 Summer Olympics
Olympic gymnasts of the Netherlands
Sportspeople from Gouda, South Holland